The 2010–11 Zimbabwean cricket season consists of international matches played by the Zimbabwean cricket team as well as Zimbabwean domestic cricket matches under the auspices of Zimbabwe Cricket.

International cricket

2009–10 ICC Intercontinental Cup

Fifth match: Ireland

Sixth match: Scotland

ODI series
 Irish cricket team in Zimbabwe in 2010–11
 Zimbabwean cricket team in South Africa in 2010–11
 Zimbabwean cricket team in Bangladesh in 2010–11
 2011 Cricket World Cup

Domestic cricket

Logan Cup

 In progress

Metbank Pro40 Championship

 In progress

Stanbic Bank 20 Series

 Winners Mashonaland Eagles

References

 
Zimbabwean cricket seasons from 2000–01